The Memphis Suspension Railway or Mud Island Monorail is a suspended monorail that connects the city center of Memphis with the entertainment park on Mud Island. Celebrating its grand opening on July 3, 1982, it is located beneath a footbridge over the Wolf River Lagoon connecting to the southern tip of Mud Island.

The line has two suspended cars constructed in Switzerland, delivered in summer 1981. The  bridge opened to pedestrians on June 29, 1981; the  monorail was not operational until July 1982. The cars are driven by a  external cable, instead of by internal motors. The two cars simultaneously shuttle back and forth on parallel tracks between the Front Street Terminal on the downtown side and the Mud Island Terminal.

At the time of its construction, the U.S. Coast Guard stated that the proposed bridge would have to have the same clearance as the Hernando de Soto Bridge, as it was spanning a commercially used public waterway. This resulted in the bridge being constructed at its current elevation.

The monorail was indefinitely closed on July 6, 2018. It opens occasionally for special events.

Incidents and accidents
On June 19, 1994, a 19-year-old female Memphis State University student, Shellie M. McKnight, fell while cleaning the exterior windows of one of the cars and died. The  fatal fall was ruled accidental by Memphis Police.
Her family lost the lawsuit they filed against the City of Memphis.

On September 29, 2018, six passengers were trapped in one of the cars when it stalled mid-transit. The stall was caused by a fuse that was tripped. About 20 minutes after the vehicle initially stalled, the driver evacuated the vehicle onto the pedestrian bridge above. Nobody involved was injured.

In popular culture
In the 1993 film The Firm, Mitch McDeere, played by Tom Cruise, uses the railway to escape from "The Firm" that is out to kill him.

References

External links

 Mud Island Monorail official website

Monorails
Suspended monorails
Railway lines opened in 1982
People mover systems in the United States
Cable railways in the United States
Truss bridges in the United States
Pedestrian bridges in the United States
Monorails in the United States
Railroad bridges in Tennessee
1982 establishments in Tennessee
Passenger rail transportation in Tennessee
Transportation in Memphis, Tennessee
Buildings and structures in Memphis, Tennessee
Articles containing video clips